The 2005 Pepsi 400 was a NASCAR Nextel Cup Series event held on July 2, 2005, at Daytona International Speedway in Daytona Beach, Florida. Contested over 160 laps, Tony Stewart, driver of the No. 20 Joe Gibbs Racing Chevrolet, won the race from the pole position, and led the most laps.

Former United States Secretary of Defense Donald Rumsfeld was the grand marshal. Pop singer Jojo sang "The Star-Spangled Banner" prior to the event.

This was the last Pepsi 400 to be broadcast on NBC until 2015.

Qualifying

Race
The race was delayed for two and a half hours because of rain. When the green flag was flown, it was flown with the yellow because track crews were still drying the track; the race officially began thirty minutes later. The official green flag was flown after 11 laps. During a green flag stop, Scott Riggs did not know that drivers in front of him were pitting, and when he attempted to swerve away from a slowing Jamie McMurray, whom Riggs stated did not tell him that he was pitting, Riggs ran into Mark Martin, and Kurt Busch, Casey Mears, Bobby Labonte, and Matt Kenseth are among the drivers collected in the wreck. On Lap 73, points leader Greg Biffle was hit by Michael Waltrip, who was spinning due to a cut tire. The remainder of the race was primarily dominated by Tony Stewart and Jimmie Johnson, who both led for the first 103 laps of the race. With 15 laps to go, the 2nd big one struck taking out 7 cars. It started when Carl Edwards hooked Kevin Harvick into Jeff Burton and both Harvick and Edwards spun. More cars spun in the tri-oval and going into turn 1 from going through the wet infield grass including Kyle Busch, Robby Gordon, Scott Wimmer, and Elliott Sadler.

With nine laps left, Stewart led McMurray; Kasey Kahne; Johnson; and Dale Earnhardt Jr. Kahne, who was running on old tires, fell out of contention. Stewart would lead for the remainder of the race, marking the first time Stewart won a restrictor plate race. Stewart led a total of 151 laps, which broke Cale Yarborough's record of 142 set in 1968. The race was also the first time Stewart performed his post-victory celebration of climbing the fence to the flag stand to collect the checkered flag.

Results

Standings after the race

References

Pepsi 400
Pepsi 400
NASCAR races at Daytona International Speedway